Roberta Felotti (born 22 October 1964 in Milan) is an Italian former freestyle and medley swimmer who competed in the 1980 Summer Olympics, in the 1984 Summer Olympics, and in the 1988 Summer Olympics.

References

1964 births
Living people
Swimmers from Milan
Italian female freestyle swimmers
Italian female medley swimmers
Olympic swimmers of Italy
Swimmers at the 1980 Summer Olympics
Swimmers at the 1984 Summer Olympics
Swimmers at the 1988 Summer Olympics
Swimmers at the 1979 Mediterranean Games
Swimmers at the 1983 Mediterranean Games
Swimmers at the 1987 Mediterranean Games
Mediterranean Games gold medalists for Italy
Mediterranean Games medalists in swimming